Luigi Villoresi (16 May 1909 – 24 August 1997) was an Italian Grand Prix motor racing driver who started racing in Formula One at the time of its inception.

Biography
Born in Milan, Lombardy, and nicknamed "Gigi", he was the older brother of race car driver Emilio Villoresi who co-piloted with him in several races at the beginning of their careers. From a prosperous family, Villoresi could afford to buy a car and began competing in local rallies at the age of twenty-two with a Lancia Lambda and a few years later acquired a Fiat Balilla with which he and his brother Emilio competed in the Mille Miglia. In 1935, he raced in the Coppa Ciano, finishing third and went on to capture the Italian driving championship in the 1100 cc sports car class. The following year he and his brother purchased a Maserati which they drove individually in different races. Emilio was so successful that he was signed to drive an Alfa Romeo for Scuderia Ferrari in the 1937 season.

In 1938, Luigi Villoresi became part of the Maserati team, driving the 8CTF model that Maserati had designed to compete with the dominant German Silver Arrows. In 1939, Maserati introduced the Maserati 4CL which Villoresi drove to victory at the 1939 South African Grand Prix. Unfortunately, his brother Emilio died later that year while testing an Alfa Romeo 158/159 Alfetta factory racer at the Autodromo Nazionale Monza. A little over two weeks after his brother's death, he drove his Maserati to victory at the 1939 Adriatic Grand Prix. His racing career was interrupted by the onset of World War II. At war's end, he went to America to compete in the 1946 Indianapolis 500, and afterwards he then returned to race for Maserati until 1949 when he signed again with Ferrari debuting in Formula One on 21 May 1950.

1949
Villoresi finished second in the 1949 Buenos Aires Grand Prix-President Juan Peron Grand Prix. Villoresi won the first Grand Prix de Bruxelles, beating Alexander Orley of the United States. Orley was six seconds behind. Louis Rosier was victorious in a blue Talbot, in a  Grand Prix at Spa-Francorchamps, in June 1949. He took the lead following 23 laps and came across the finish line in front of Villoresi. Villoresi was third in a  international race at Silverstone in September 1949. Italian drivers made a clean sweep of the first three positions with Ascari first and Giuseppe Farina second as 100,000 fans looked on. English driver St. John Horsfall died when his car crashed at a turn.

1950–1951
Villoresi skidded on oil, penetrated a barrier, and killed three spectators at the Grand Prix des Nations race in Geneva (Switzerland). Nino Farina impacted Villoresi's car at high speed but was uninjured. Villoresi broke his left leg and suffered head injuries which were treated at a hospital. The Grand Prix of 272 kilometres was won by Juan Manuel Fangio. The 1951 British Grand Prix was taken by José Froilán González of Argentina. Villoresi completed 88 laps, 2 behind Gonzalez.

1952
In July 1952 Villoresi won the French Grand Prix at Les Sables d'Olonne, driving a Ferrari. Ferrari achieved a 1,2,3 sweep at the Grand Prix d'France in La Baule, in August 1952. Alberto Ascari was first, followed by Villoresi and Rosier. Ascari had already clinched the Formula One World Championship before this event. Villoresi drove a Ferrari to win the 1952 Grand Prix of Modena in 1:5:21 over a distance of 100 laps, .

1953–1954
Villoresi displayed his agility as a driver in the 1953 Italian Grand Prix at Monza. Giuseppe Farina made contact with the Maserati driven by Onofre Marimón as he was approaching the finish line. Villoresi made a brilliant manoeuvre while racing at  The crowd came to its feet to witness his quick thinking in pulling his car off the track at great speed. Villoresi then finished third after winner Fangio and Farina, who was two seconds behind at the end. The race marked the first time a Ferrari did not win an event in races counting toward the Formula One World Championship.

Already 41 years old, Villoresi served as an elder statesman for the Formula One team, notably as Alberto Ascari's mentor who became his closest friend. In 1954, he and Ascari joined the new Lancia racing team but Ascari's death in the spring of the following year profoundly affected Villoresi and his career went into steep decline.

Villoresi was critically injured while testing a Lancia Aurelia near Rimini, Italy in April 1954. He was riding with his mechanic when he skidded while attempting to avoid a Fiat driving in the opposite direction. Both Villoresi and his mechanic were pinned beneath the Lancia. A group of farmers came to their aid, using oxen to lift the car. Both men remained conscious. Villoresi sustained a number of deep head wounds, facial lacerations, and bruises all over his body. He was listed in serious, but not critical condition.

1955–1958
Villoresi was third after Ascari and Luigi Musso in the May 1955 Naples Grand Prix, a  event. Villoresi was in a Lancia.

He wrecked his car in the 1956 Grand Prix of Rome, a 2-Litre sports car event.
The race was won by Jean Behra in a Maserati.

Villoresi was one of nine drivers, from a starting field of 303, in a January 1958 Monte Carlo auto rally, who completed the first leg of the rigorous touring car event, without incurring a penalty. The  endurance event featured cars from eight different European starting locales. Of the starters, 72 entrants crossed the finish line but 13 were disqualified because of lateness. Villoresi drove a Lancia.

Villoresi retired from Grand Prix racing in 1957 after 31 Formula One championship starts without a victory but made it to the podium eight times while scoring a total of 49 championship points. Villoresi continued rally racing and won the Acropolis Rally in Greece in 1958 before retiring to a home in Modena.

Villoresi died in 1997 at the age of eighty-eight.

Major victories
Alsace Grand Prix 1947
British Grand Prix 1948
Coppa Acerbo 1938
Coppa Edda Ciano 1938
Dutch Grand Prix 1949
Grand Prix d'Albigeois 1938, 1948
Grand Prix de Bruxelles 1949
Grand Prix du Comminges 1948
Grand Prix de Marseilles 1950, 1951
Gran Premio de Modena 1952
Grand Prix de Nice 1946, 1947
Grand Prix de Nîmes 1947
Pau Grand Prix 1951
Grand Prix of Naples 1948
Gran Premio del Valentino 1952
Interlagos Grand Prix 1949
Lausanne Grand Prix 1947
Mille Miglia 1951
Penya Rhin Grand Prix 1948
Buenos Aires Grand Prix-General Juan Perón Grand Prix 1947, 1948
Buenos Aires Grand Prix-Eva Duarte Perón Grand Prix 1947, 1948
Rio de Janeiro Grand Prix 1949
Giro de Sicilia 1953
Syracuse Grand Prix 1951
South African Grand Prix 1939
Targa Florio 1939, 1940
Masaryk Circuit Grand Prix 1937
Tripoli Grand Prix 1937
Zandvoort Grand Prix 1949

Complete Formula One World Championship results
(key) (Races in italics indicate fastest lap)

* Indicates shared drive with Alberto Ascari
† Indicates shared drive with Joakim Bonnier

Non-championship Formula One results
(key)

* Indicates shared drive with Alberto Ascari
† Indicates shared drive with Giuseppe Farina

Indy 500 results

References

1909 births
1997 deaths
Racing drivers from Milan
Grand Prix drivers
Indianapolis 500 drivers
Italian Formula One drivers
Ferrari Formula One drivers
Maserati Formula One drivers
Lancia Formula One drivers
Scuderia Centro Sud Formula One drivers
24 Hours of Le Mans drivers
World Sportscar Championship drivers
24 Hours of Spa drivers
Formula One team owners
Italian motorsport people
European Championship drivers